Stewart Bridgewater Linder (November 8, 1931 – January 12, 2006) was an American film editor with 25 credits. He shared the Academy Award for Best Film Editing for the 1966 film Grand Prix (directed by John Frankenheimer), which was the very first film on which Linder was credited as an editor. Linder is particularly noted for his long collaboration (1982–2006) with the director Barry Levinson. Perhaps the best remembered film from their collaboration, which extended over 20 films, was Rain Man (1988), which won the Academy Award for Best Picture. Linder won an ACE Eddie award for editing this film, and was nominated for both the Academy Award and the BAFTA Award for Best Editing.

Death
Linder died on January 12, 2006, of a heart attack, at the age of 74.

Legacy
The 2006 film Man of the Year starring Robin Williams is dedicated to Linder's memory. Stu was on location editing this feature when he died of a heart attack. His co-editor, Blair Daily was the first on scene.

Partial filmography
 The Misfits (1961)
 The Man Who Shot Liberty Valance (1962)
 Seconds (1966)
 Grand Prix (1966)
 Blue (1968)
 Catch-22 (1970)
 Carnal Knowledge (1971)
 The Day of the Dolphin (1973)
 The Fortune (1975)
 My Bodyguard (1980)
 First Family (1980)
 Diner (1982)
 Six Weeks (1982)
 The Natural (1984)
 Code Name: Emerald (1985)
 Young Sherlock Holmes (1985)
 Tin Men (1987)
 Good Morning, Vietnam (1987)
 Rain Man (1988)
 Avalon (1990)
 Bugsy (1991)
 Toys (1992)
 Quiz Show (1994)
 Disclosure (1994)
 Sleepers (1996)
 Wag the Dog (1997)
 Sphere (1998)
 Liberty Heights (1999)
 An Everlasting Piece (2000)
 Bandits (2001)
 Envy (2004)

See also
List of film director and editor collaborations

References

1931 births
2006 deaths
American film editors
Best Film Editing Academy Award winners
People from Geneva, Illinois